Neoprotoparmelia brasilisidiata is a species of corticolous (bark-dwelling), crustose lichen in the family Parmeliaceae. It has a neotropical distribution, and has been recorded from Costa Rica, El Salvador, and Brazil, where it grows in parks and open areas. The lichen was formally described as a new species in 2018 by Garima Singh, Marcela Eugenia da Silva Cáceres, and André Aptroot. The specific epithet brasilisidiata refers to both the country where it was first scientifically documented, as well as the presence of isidia. The lichen contains secondary compounds that can be detected using thin-layer chromatography, including alectoronic acid (major), and minor to trace amounts of dehydroalectoronic acid and β-alectoronic acid. When shone with a UV light, the medulla of the thallus and the isidia have a greenish white glow; this characteristic can be used to help distinguish it from other similar crusts with isidia.

References

brasilisidiata
Lichen species
Lichens described in 2018
Lichens of Brazil
Lichens of Central America
Taxa named by André Aptroot
Taxa named by Marcela Cáceres